Potoki is a settlement in the Municipality of Jesenice in the Upper Carniola region of Slovenia.

References

External links
Potoki on Geopedia

Populated places in the Municipality of Jesenice